Zachary Desmond Maynard (born July 29, 1989) is a former American football quarterback who played college football for the California Golden Bears and Buffalo Bulls. He is the older half-brother of current Los Angeles Chargers wide receiver Keenan Allen.

Early years
Maynard attended Grimsley High School in Greensboro, North Carolina, where he led his team to a Metro League title as a senior in 2007. He committed to Buffalo to play for coach Turner Gill.

College career

Buffalo
Maynard began his college career as the backup quarterback to Drew Willy, and saw limited action during the Bulls 2008 season, culminating with the team's 2008 MAC championship, and an appearance in the 2009 International Bowl. For the 2009 season, Maynard took over for Willy as the team's starting quarterback and led the Bulls to a 5–7 record. During a 54–27 loss to Pittsburgh in the second week of the season, Maynard threw for 400 yards and 4 touchdowns. During the 2009 season, Maynard accounted for 2,994 yards of total offense, the second highest single-season total in Buffalo football history.

California
In January 2010, after Jeff Quinn replaced Gill as Buffalo coach, Maynard transferred to the University of California to play for coach Jeff Tedford. The move reunited him with his younger half-brother, Keenan Allen, who had committed to Cal to play wide receiver. After sitting out the 2010 season per NCAA transfer rules, Maynard won the starting job at Cal for the 2011 season. Maynard's 2,990 passing yards in 2011 were the third-highest single-season total in Cal history, as he led the Golden Bears to a 7–6 record and an appearance in the 2011 Holiday Bowl. During the 2012 season, Maynard started nine games before an injury suffered in a game against Washington prematurely ended his season, as California slumped to a 3–9 record in what would prove to be Tedford's final season as coach of the Golden Bears.

College statistics

References

External links
California Golden Bears bio

Living people
Players of American football from Greensboro, North Carolina
American football quarterbacks
Buffalo Bulls football players
California Golden Bears football players
1989 births
Grimsley High School alumni